Nidamarru is a village in West Godavari district of the Indian state of Andhra Pradesh.

Demographics 

 Census of India, Nidamarru had a population of 4082. The total population constitute, 2071 males and 2011 females with a sex ratio of 971 females per 1000 males. 401 children are in the age group of 0–6 years, with sex ratio of 966. The average literacy rate stands at 72.10%.

References 

Villages in West Godavari district